Cascade Creek is a stream that flows south then southeast from its source on White Hill to its confluence with San Anselmo Creek just west of Fairfax in Marin County, California.

Ecology
Although short on water by late summer, fisheries ecologist Dr. Alice Rich considered Cascade Creek to have the best Steelhead trout (Oncorhynchus mykiss) habitat in the Corte Madera Creek watershed. However, Cascade Falls presents an impassable barrier to steelhead spawning migrations. Rich also noted that Cascade Creek's steep gradient and low flow conditions were not suitable rearing habitat for juvenile trout, the latter typically spending a year in freshwater before outmigrating to San Francisco Bay.

Rich documented several anecdotal records for the occurrence of Coho salmon (Oncorhynchus kisutch) in tributaries of Corte Madera Creek, including Cascade Creek. According to Leidy, suitable habitat for coho salmon is present in Cascade Creek and most other Corte Madera Creek tributaries.

See also
 San Anselmo Creek
 List of watercourses in the San Francisco Bay Area

References

External links
 Friends of Corte Madera Creek Watershed
 Corte Madera/Ross Valley Watershed pages at Marin Watersheds

Rivers of Marin County, California
Rivers of Northern California
Tributaries of Corte Madera Creek (Marin County)